Liberty High School is a public secondary school located in Peoria, Arizona, United States. The high school is a part of the Peoria Unified School District. The school opened in August 2006 due to overcrowding at Sunrise Mountain High School and rapid population growth in Peoria. Currently, approximately 2,350 students are enrolled, making it the district's second-largest high school.

Sports
 Baseball (boys')
 Basketball (boys' and girls')
 Cheer (boys' and girls')
 Cross country (boys' and girls')
 Football (boys')
 Golf (boys' and girls')
 Soccer (boys' and girls')
 Mountain biking (boys' and girls') (NICA)
 Softball (girls')
 Swim/Dive (boys' and girls')
 Tennis (boys' and girls')
 Track (boys' and girls')
 Volleyball (boys' and girls')
 Wrestling (boys')

Notable alumni
 Kyle Hinton, football player

References

External links
 

Public high schools in Arizona
Education in Peoria, Arizona
Educational institutions established in 2006
Schools in Maricopa County, Arizona
2006 establishments in Arizona